AP6 or AP-6 may refer to :
 Autopista AP-6, a motorway in Spain
 USS William Ward Burrows (AP-6), a 1926 US Navy transport ship
 Asia-Pacific Partnership on Clean Development and Climate, an international non-treaty agreement among ASEAN countries launched on January 12, 2006
 The sixth Swedish national pension fund (Sjunde AP-fonden )
 Chrysler AP6 Valiant, a car build by Chrysler Australia from 1965 to 1966